Sosbun Brakk is one of the mountain peaks of the Spantik-Sosbun Mountains, part of a subrange of the Karakoram range in Gilgit-Baltistan, Pakistan.

Location 

Climbing history 
In 1976, a German expedition team tried to reach the summit but failed. Finally, on 4 July 1982, a Japanese team led by Seiichi Kawauchi of the Japanese Alpine Club successfully climbed the mountain. Hisao Hashimoto, Mikio Tabata, and Norichika Matsumoto were the other people on the Japanese team.

References 

Mountains of Pakistan
Mountains of Gilgit-Baltistan